Evergreen is an unincorporated town, a post office, and a census-designated place (CDP) located in and governed by Jefferson County, Colorado, U.S. The CDP is a part of the Denver–Aurora–Lakewood, CO Metropolitan Statistical Area. The Evergreen post office has the ZIP Codes 80439 and 80437 (for post office boxes). At the United States Census 2020, the population of the Evergreen CDP was 9,307. The Evergreen Metropolitan District provides services.

History
The Evergreen post office has been in operation since 1876. The community was named for evergreen trees surrounding the town. The Colorado Blue Spruce Monument is located in the town, in honor of the Colorado state tree.

Geography
Its addresses are oriented according to the Street_system_of_Denver.

Climate

According to the Köppen Climate Classification system, Evergreen has an oceanic climate, abbreviated "Cfb" on climate maps.

Demographics

Law and government
Since Evergreen is an unincorporated area, services usually provided by a city's government are provided by multiple agencies. The county maintains the roads (less State Highway 74), oversees planning and zoning, provides primary and secondary education through its school district and provides law enforcement through its sheriff's office. Evergreen Fire/Rescue provides fire protection and emergency medical response service. Water and sewer services operate under the administration of the Evergreen Metropolitan District.

Transportation
The two major roads in Evergreen are State Highway 74 and County Highway 73. Highway 74 runs south from Interstate 70 through Bergen Park and northern Evergreen to downtown, then turns east and follows Bear Creek Canyon to its end at State Highway 8 near Red Rocks Park. Highway 73 runs south from downtown Evergreen to connect with U.S. Highway 285 in Conifer.

Bus service in Evergreen is offered by Denver Regional Transportation District. TheRide regional routes E and Z run to downtown Denver and there is call-n-Ride curb-to-curb transportation service in town.

Sites of interest

Evergreen Lake, a popular recreation area, was created by damming Bear Creek in 1927. It sits above downtown Evergreen, which includes a mix of historic buildings and local businesses, including the well-known entertainment venue and restaurant The Little Bear.

In the winter, ice skating is offered at Evergreen Lake. The skating season usually runs from mid-to-late December (approximately Christmas) to late March depending upon ice thickness and weather. Evergreen Lake is the venue of the annual Skate the Lake celebration that takes place on New Year's Eve and the Evergreen Pond Hockey Championship which usually takes place in the first weekend of January.

Registered Historic Places in Evergreen include:
 Bergen Park
 Dedisse Park
 Evergreen Conference District
 Everhardt Ranch
 Fillius Park
 Hiwan Homestead
 Humphrey House
 O'Fallon Park
 Pence Park

Major parks

Evergreen is surrounded by thousands of acres of land in the Denver Mountain Parks and Jefferson County Open Space park systems. The Denver Mountain Parks in the area are Bergen Park, Corwina Park, Dedisse Park, Dillon Park, Fillius Park, O'Fallon Park and Pence Park in Indian Hills. The Jefferson County Open Space Parks are Alderfer/Three Sisters, Elk Meadow, Lair o' the Bear, and Mount Falcon Park in Indian Hills. Hiwan Golf Club, a country club located just east of Bergen Park, is Evergreen's only country club. Popular both in the summer and the winter, Evergreen Lake and its "Lake House" are recreational focal points for the region.

Education

Evergreen is served by the Jefferson County Public Schools. Schools in the Evergreen CDP include:
Bergen Valley Elementary School and Wilmot Elementary School
Evergreen Middle School
Evergreen High School

Some other areas with Evergreen addresses to the south fall into the area for Conifer High School. Most students in the Evergreen area go to Evergreen Middle School.  There are four elementary schools in the Evergreen area; Bergen Meadow, Bergen Valley, Wilmot, and Marshdale Elementary.

Residents with Evergreen addresses west of the Clear Creek County line are served by Clear Creek Schools with students attending King-Murphy Elementary, Clear Creek Middle School, and Clear Creek High School.

Private schools in Evergreen include Evergreen Academy, Evergreen Country Day School, Grace Christian School, and Montessori School Of Evergreen.

Charter schools in Evergreen include Rocky Mountain Academy of Evergreen. It serves students K–8th grade. 

Open Enrollment - Jefferson Country school district is an open enrollment district. As long as there is sufficient space you can enroll your child in any Jefferson County school.

Notable residents
Jeffrey Ashby, astronaut graduated from Evergreen High School in 1972
Berkley Breathed, cartoonist, author, director, and screenwriter
Jasmine Cresswell, romance novelist
Diane Mott Davidson, author
Nate Dern, author and comedian
Joanne Greenberg, author
Scott Hamilton, Olympic gold medal figure skater
Gary Hart, U.S. senator and diplomat
John Hinckley, Jr., shot President Ronald Reagan, lived in Evergreen
Noah Hoffman, Olympic cross country skier
Kevin Kouzmanoff, MLB player grew up in Evergreen and graduated from Evergreen High School in 1999
Willie Nelson, singer and songwriter owned a 44-acre ranch in Evergreen for several years
Trey Parker, South Park co-creator graduated from Evergreen High School in 1988
Jake Roper, Internet personality
Peter Scanavino, actor

See also

Outline of Colorado
Index of Colorado-related articles
State of Colorado
Colorado cities and towns
Colorado census designated places
Colorado counties
Jefferson County, Colorado
List of statistical areas in Colorado
Front Range Urban Corridor
North Central Colorado Urban Area
Denver-Aurora-Boulder, CO Combined Statistical Area
Denver-Aurora-Broomfield, CO Metropolitan Statistical Area

References

External links

Evergreen @ Colorado.com
Evergreen @ UncoverColorado.com
Evergreen Metropolitan District
Evergreen Park & Recreation District
Evergreen Area Chamber of Commerce
The Evergreen Experience
Historic Downtown Evergreen
Jefferson County website
Jeffco Public Schools

Census-designated places in Jefferson County, Colorado
Census-designated places in Colorado
Denver metropolitan area